This is a list of the 62 municipalities in the province of Pontevedra in the autonomous community of Galicia, Spain.

The Galician name is the sole official form of the name;

older or informal texts may use Castillan forms or spellings.

References

See also
Geography of Galicia
Geography of Spain
List of cities in Spain

Pontevedra